Botanical Gardens Cricket Ground was a cricket ground in Old Trafford, Stretford, Lancashire. The ground was located adjacent to Manchester Botanical Garden. The ground was on land owned by Sir Humphrey de Trafford, who allowed Manchester Cricket Club to lease the ground.

The first recorded match that is now considered to have been first-class on the ground was in 1848, when Manchester Cricket Club played Sheffield Cricket Club. The following season a Lancashire team played a team from Yorkshire. In 1851, a Lancashire side played their second and final first-class match at the ground in a repeat of the previous first-class fixture there involving. Manchester Cricket Club played two further first-class matches at the ground in 1852 and then 1854, both coming against Sheffield Cricket Club.

The final recorded match held on the ground came in 1856 when Manchester Cricket Club played rugby.  Shortly after the ground was developed for the 1857 Art Treasures Exhibition. Later, the location of the ground became a motorcycle speedway venue before closing in 1982. Today the location of the ground is covered by the White City Retail Centre.

References

External links
Botanical Gardens Cricket Ground on CricketArchive
Botanical Gardens Cricket Ground on Cricinfo

Defunct cricket grounds in England
Cricket grounds in Greater Manchester
Sports venues in Manchester
Defunct sports venues in Greater Manchester
Sports venues completed in 1848
1848 establishments in England